Jonathan Leonardo Farías (born 27 March 1998) is an Argentinian footballer currently playing as a midfielder for Agropecuario.

Career
Farias left Cercle Brugge and on 1 February 2019 it was confirmed, that Farias had signed with Aldosivi, but at the beginning would play with the reserve squad. He left the club at the end of 2019.

Career statistics

Club

Notes

References

1998 births
Living people
Footballers from Buenos Aires
Argentine footballers
Argentine expatriate footballers
Association football midfielders
Challenger Pro League players
Primera Nacional players
Cercle Brugge K.S.V. players
Aldosivi footballers
Defensa y Justicia footballers
Club Agropecuario Argentino players
Argentine expatriate sportspeople in Belgium
Expatriate footballers in Belgium